Petukhovsky (masculine), Petukhovskaya (feminine), or Petukhovskoye (neuter) is the name of several rural localities in Russia:
Petukhovskoye, a village in Novodostovalovsky Selsoviet of Belozersky District of Kurgan Oblast
Petukhovskaya, Kargopolsky District, Arkhangelsk Oblast, a village in Usachevsky Selsoviet of Kargopolsky District of Arkhangelsk Oblast
Petukhovskaya, Velsky District, Arkhangelsk Oblast, a village in Muravyevsky Selsoviet of Velsky District of Arkhangelsk Oblast